Graphium weiskei, the purple spotted swallowtail, is a species of butterfly in the swallowtail family; Papilionidae. It is found only in the highlands of New Guinea.

The name honours the collector Emil Weiske.

See also
 Graphium stresemanni – visually similar species

References
 
 Müller, C.J. and Tennent, W.J 1999 A New Species of Graphium Scopoli (Lepidoptera: Papilionidae) from the Bismarck Archipelago, Papua New Guinea 1999 Records of the Australian Museum 51: (161-168) pdf  Presents a key to the closely related Graphium kosii, Graphium weiskei (Ribbe), G.stresemanni (Rothschild), G. batjanensis Okano, G. macleayanum (Leach) and G. gelon (Boisduval) all of which are confined to the Australasian region.

External links
 
 

Weiskei
Lepidoptera of New Guinea
Butterflies described in 1900